Aqcheh Qayeh (also Romanized as Āqcheh Qayeh; also known as Āqjeh Qayā, Āqjeh Qayah, Āqjeh Qayeh, Āqjeh Qīā, and Aqjeh Qīya) is a village in Howmeh Rural District of Do Tappeh District of Khodabandeh County, Zanjan province, Iran. At the 2006 National Census, its population was 1,469 in 312 households, when its rural district was in the Central District. The following census in 2011 counted 1,537 people in 434 households. The latest census in 2016 showed a population of 1,426 people in 401 households; it was the capital of its rural district. Howmeh Rural District became a part of Do Tappeh District at its establishment in 2019.

References 

Khodabandeh County

Populated places in Zanjan Province

Populated places in Khodabandeh County